Lewis Lake is a lake in the U.S. state of Massachusetts. It is located 0.5 mi southeast of Winthrop.

References

Lakes of Massachusetts
Lakes of Suffolk County, Massachusetts
Winthrop, Massachusetts